This was the thirteenth season of the rugby league League Cup, which was this season known as the John Player Special Trophy for sponsorship reasons.

Leeds won the trophy, beating Widnes by the score of 18-10 in the final. The match was played at Central Park, Wigan and the attendance was 9,510. The gate receipts were £19824.

Background 
This season saw one change in the  entrants, Kent Invicta joined the  league and also the  competition, the number of entrants now rising to thirty-four
The preliminary round now increased to two matches and involved four clubs, to reduce the numbers of entrants to the  first round proper to thirty-two
Unfortunately, early in the  season Bramley went into administration, and although they survived, during this period of administration they withdrew from  this competition, leaving Hull Kingston Rovers with a bye in the  first round.

Competition and results

Preliminary round 

Involved  2 matches and 4 Clubs

Round 1 - First  Round 

Involved  15 matches with one bye and 31 Clubs

Round 1 - First  Round Replays 
Involved 1 match and 2 Clubs

Round 2 - Second  Round 

Involved  8 matches and 16 Clubs

Round 3 -Quarter Finals 

Involved 4 matches with 8 clubs

Round 4 – Semi-Finals 

Involved 2 matches and 4 Clubs

Final

Teams and scorers 

Scoring - Try = four points - Goal = two points - Drop goal = one point

Prize money 
As part of the sponsorship deal and funds, the  prize money awarded to the competing teams for this season is as follows :-

Note - the  author is unable to trace the award amounts for this season. Can anyone help ?

The road to success 
This tree excludes any preliminary round fixtures

Notes and comments 
1 * This match had been chosen for Saturday BBC coverage but was cancelled and moved to Sunday at two days notice due to Industrial Action at the BBC
2 * Kent Invicta's record crowd
3 * 3 dropped goals
4 * Bramley withdrew from this competition while in liquidation
5 * highest score (and highest away score) o date between two professional clubs
6 * Wigan official archives state the home team are Leigh, an obvious printing error as earlier in the same fixture list Leigh are away at CarlisleCarlisle
7  * Central Park was the home ground of Wigan with a final capacity of 18,000, although the record attendance was  47,747 for Wigan v St Helens 27 March 1959

General information for those unfamiliar 
The council of the Rugby Football League voted to introduce a new competition, to be similar to The Football Association and Scottish Football Association's "League Cup". It was to be a similar knock-out structure to, and to be secondary to, the Challenge Cup. As this was being formulated, sports sponsorship was becoming more prevalent and as a result John Player and Sons, a division of Imperial Tobacco Company, became sponsors, and the competition never became widely known as the "League Cup" 
The competition ran from 1971-72 until 1995-96 and was initially intended for the professional clubs plus the two amateur BARLA National Cup finalists. In later seasons the entries were expanded to take in other amateur and French teams. The competition was dropped due to "fixture congestion" when Rugby League became a summer sport
The Rugby League season always (until the onset of "Summer Rugby" in 1996) ran from around August-time through to around May-time and this competition always took place early in the season, in the Autumn, with the final usually taking place in late January 
The competition was variably known, by its sponsorship name, as the Player's No.6 Trophy (1971–1977), the John Player Trophy (1977–1983), the John Player Special Trophy (1983–1989), and the Regal Trophy in 1989.

See also 
1983–84 Rugby Football League season
1983 Lancashire Cup
1983 Yorkshire Cup
John Player Special Trophy
Rugby league county cups

References

External links
Saints Heritage Society
1896–97 Northern Rugby Football Union season at wigan.rlfans.com 
Hull&Proud Fixtures & Results 1896/1897
Widnes Vikings - One team, one passion Season In Review - 1896-97
The Northern Union at warringtonwolves.org
Huddersfield R L Heritage
Wakefield until I die

1983 in English rugby league
1984 in English rugby league
League Cup (rugby league)